WEEN (1460 AM, "Solid Gospel 1460") is a radio station broadcasting a Southern Gospel music format. Licensed to Lafayette, Tennessee, United States, the station is currently owned by Lafayette Broadcasting Co., Inc. and features programming from Salem Radio Network and Talk Radio Network.

References

External links
 

Southern Gospel radio stations in the United States
Macon County, Tennessee
Radio stations established in 1971
EEN